Ingrid Esperanza Várgas Calvo (born 27 December 1989) is a Peruvian former tennis player.

In her career, she won two doubles titles on the ITF circuit. On 6 July 2009, she reached her best singles ranking of world No. 487. On 11 June 2012, she peaked at No. 671 in the doubles rankings.

In April 2009, Várgas Calvo played two rubbers for the Peru Fed Cup team.

ITF finals

Singles (0–1)

Doubles (2–1)

Fed Cup participation

Singles

References
 
 
 

1989 births
Living people
Peruvian female tennis players
20th-century Peruvian women
21st-century Peruvian women